The chestnut-flanked white-eye (Zosterops erythropleurus) is a bird in the family Zosteropidae. The species was first described by Robert Swinhoe in 1863. It is found in forests, and prefers rather deep mixed and coniferous forests.

Description
It is 10.5 cm in length and has a distinct chestnut patch on its flanks. The bill base and lower mandible may be pinkish. Its underparts are whiter. The similar Japanese white-eye is pale brown on its flanks.

Distribution and habitat
It is migratory, breeding in Manchuria and migrating to central China, the province of Yunnan and northern Southeast Asia in the winter. It is the most migratory species of white-eye. It breeds in poplar, alder and willow forests, thickets and groves, and winters in deciduous and evergreen forests, usually above 1000 m.

References

chestnut-flanked white-eye
Birds of Manchuria
chestnut-flanked white-eye
Taxonomy articles created by Polbot